In the Shadows is the third full-length studio album by Danish heavy metal band Mercyful Fate. It is the first offering of the band since their reunion in 1992. This would be the final full-length album Timi Hansen would appear on before his death in 2019. The album was released in 1993 via Metal Blade Records. Unlike previous Mercyful Fate albums, which were entirely centered around lyrical themes of Satanism and the occult, the lyrics on this album are rather focused on more conceptual horror-themes, akin to King Diamond's work with his eponymous band. The band would not return to a primarily occult/Satanic lyrical approach until the band's latest album, 9, released in 1999. 

Some editions of In the Shadows contain a bonus track, "Return of the Vampire... 1993", that is a re-recording of the song "Return of the Vampire", present in the homonymous 1992 compilation album, featuring Lars Ulrich of Metallica on drums.

The album cover was painted by Torbjorn Jorgensen / Studio Dzyan.

Track listing

Personnel
Mercyful Fate
King Diamond - vocals, producer, mixing
Hank Shermann - guitars, producer
Michael Denner - guitars
Timi Hansen - bass guitar
Snowy Shaw - drums (credited, but didn't play on the album)

Additional musicians
Morten Nielsen - drums, except on "Return of the Vampire... 1993"
John Marshall - harpsichord on track 9
Lars Ulrich -  drums on "Return of the Vampire... 1993"

Production
Tim Kimsey - producer, engineer, mixing
Sterling Winfield - assistant engineer
David Rosenblad, Thom Caccetta - digital editing
Eddy Schreyer - mastering at Future Disc, Los Angeles
Brian Slagel - executive producer
Torbjorn Jorgensen / Studio Dzyan - cover art
Thomas Grondahl - photography

References

Mercyful Fate albums
1993 albums
Metal Blade Records albums